Eucalyptus flindersii, commonly known as the South Australian grey mallee, mallee red gum, or grey mallee, is a species of mallee that is endemic to South Australia. It usually has smooth, pinkish grey bark, lance-shaped to curved adult leaves, flower buds in groups of three or seven and conical or hemispherical fruit with the valves protruding.

Description
Flowering occurs between August and October and the flowers are white.

Taxonomy and naming
Eucalyptus flindersii was first formally described in 1980 by Clifford Boomsma in the Journal of the Adelaide Botanic Gardens from a specimen collected by Roger Callen on Mount Hack in the Flinders Ranges. The specific epithet (flindersii) honours Captain Matthew Flinders, after whom the Flinders Ranges, where this species occurs, was named.

Distribution and habitat
The South Australian grey mallee grows on slopes and between rocks in open woodland, mainly in the Flinders Ranges but with outliers to the south near Yunta and Quorn.

See also
List of Eucalyptus species

References

flindersii
Myrtales of Australia
Flora of South Australia
Plants described in 1980